Tempting Fate may refer to:
 Tempting Fate (1998 film), a television film by Peter Werner
 Tempting Fate (2015 film), a Nigerian-American film by Kevin Nwankwor
 Tempting Fate (2019 film), a television film

See also
 Fate (disambiguation)